Ted David, an American financial journalist, was part of the launch team that put CNBC television on the air in April 1989. Most recently, he was employed at CNBC as senior anchor for CNBC Business Radio until his retirement from the network in May, 2009.  More recently, has been heard as a freelance anchor on New York's all news station 1010 WINS. He continued to be seen occasionally as a freelance anchor on Cablevision's News12 Long Island until his retirement in August 2017. Ted has been seen or heard from time to time on ABC's former daytime drama "One Life To Live." He was also a freelance reporter and anchor at Business Week TV until the program's cancellation in late 2008.

Prior to his CNBC Radio assignment, David was co-anchor of CNBC's Morning Call. He has anchored news updates at MSNBC and has done weekend anchoring at WNBC-TV, in New York City.

Before joining CNBC, David was an ABC Radio News correspondent for eight years. Ted's other radio credits include stints at New York stations WLIX, WGBB, WGSM, WHLI, WKJY, WABC, WPIX,WPLJ, and regular business reports on WCBS NewsRadio 880.

David has won a National Press Club citation for best consumer journalism; an Ohio State Award for Excellence in Educational, Informational and Public Affairs Broadcasting, and the American Cancer Society's Gaspar Award. In 2016, Ted won the Press Club of Long Island's 2016 Media Awards First Place, Video Breaking News—Roosevelt Field Shooting."

David holds bachelor's and master's degrees and has taught in high schools and colleges. He was licensed as an emergency medical technician in New York State in 1981. He holds a certificate in technical analysis of the futures markets from the New York Institute of Finance. He is also a licensed amateur radio operator (Ham) with the call sign WB2TED.

Ted David and his wife, Jane, were married in 1974 and have two grown sons (one of whom died in a car accident in June of 2021), a grandson born in September, 2017 and a granddaughter born in February, 2021.

Host CNBC Shows
Morning Call (2002–2006)
The Edge (Mar. 2000-Feb. 2002)
Street Signs (2000–2002)
Weekly Business  (1999–2001)
Market Watch (1998–2002)
Market Wrap (1991–2000)
The Money Wheel (1989–1998)

See also
 New Yorkers in journalism

References

Amateur radio people
New York (state) television reporters
Television anchors from New York City
Living people
CNBC people
1949 births